William Adolph Danenhauer (born June 3, 1934) is a former American football player who played for Denver Broncos and Boston Patriots of the American Football League (AFL). He played college football at Emporia State University. Danenhauer served as the head football coach at the University of Nebraska Omaha from 1975 to 1977, compiling a record of 8–23–2.  He name to Nebraska–Omaha in 1970 as an assistant coach under Al Caniglia.  From 1961 to 1969, he was the head football coach at Adams City High School in Commerce City, Colorado, tallying a mark of 47–37–6. Danenhauer's son is Bill Danenhauer Jr.

Head coaching record

College

References

1934 births
Living people
American football defensive ends
American Football League players
Boston Patriots players
Denver Broncos (AFL) players
Emporia State Hornets football players
Nebraska–Omaha Mavericks football coaches
High school football coaches in Colorado
People from Clay Center, Kansas
Coaches of American football from Kansas
Players of American football from Kansas